is a player character in the Dead or Alive fighting game franchise by Team Ninja and Tecmo (Koei Tecmo). She was introduced in the original Dead or Alive in 1996 as an American professional wrestler who uses the Dead or Alive fighting tournaments as a springboard to fame and fortune. In subsequent series appearances, she is indecisive about her career interests, much to the chagrin of her overprotective father, Bass Armstrong. Tina has appeared on official series merchandise in addition to the feature film DOA: Dead or Alive, and has received critical reception as one of the most iconic video-game blondes.

Appearances

In Dead or Alive games
Tina Armstrong is the only child of famous professional wrestler Bass Armstrong, who raised her alone after her mother's death. He wanted Tina to follow him into the wrestling industry, and trains her for such at a young age. Though she is already an expert grappler by her teenage years, she dreams of expanding her horizons beyond the wrestling scene. In the original Dead or Alive game, Tina joins the Dead or Alive fighting tournament as a vehicle for becoming discovered by Hollywood. Bass opposes this decision as he does not want her to quit wrestling, and enters the competition himself to prevent her achieving her goals. Tina reaches the final match against Kasumi, which she ends up forfeiting, but nonetheless collects the cash prize after Kasumi refuses it. In Dead or Alive 2, Tina aspires to become a supermodel, for which she reverts her hair to blonde and dresses in skimpy outfits. She ends up having to fight her own father in the competition, and emerges victorious. She gets her wish and begins modeling on a television show.

In Dead or Alive 3, Tina has decided that she wants to switch from modeling to acting, she competes in the third tournament in the name of self-promotion, and defeats Bass in combat a second time when he again unsuccessfully attempts to intervene in her interests. She goes on to star in an action war film after the tournament concludes. She joins the fourth competition in Dead or Alive 4 now wanting to become a rock star, over which she and Bass quarrel before she officially defeats him for a third time. After the tournament's conclusion, she goes on to shoot a garish music video. She then departs to New Zack Island in Dead or Alive Xtreme 2 to finally escape the clutches of her overbearing father.

In Dead or Alive 5, Tina has quit competitive fighting since achieving success in the entertainment world, but she is lured out of retirement and recruited into the fifth tournament by Zack (owner of Zack Island in the Dead or Alive Xtreme games). Tina then takes out Virtua Fighter character Sarah Bryant as her reaction to Zack confusing her with Sarah. When Tina publicly announces her plans of returning to competition, Bass attempts to stop her once again, this time by posing as a tournament contestant named "Mr. Strong". After he eliminates her in the quarterfinals, he reveals his identity and Tina convinces him in turn to join her as a father-daughter tandem, but further reveals that she now wants to transition into politics, announcing a gubernatorial campaign. In Dead or Alive 6, she is already making plans for her gubernational campaign as governor, but then ultimately has to quit her goal upon realizing from Zack that she's too young to run for office. She then worked with her dad as a father-daughter tandem, also briefly having a spar with Honoka, and introducing Mila to Lisa Hamilton.

It was revealed during the fourth anniversary for Dead or Alive Xtreme Venus Vacation that Tina was added on January 28, 2022, as part of the celebration of the overall franchise's 25th anniversary.

Design and gameplay

Tina is a young white woman in her early twenties, with blonde hair and blue eyes. She is canonically listed as standing 5'9" tall and 123 pounds, and in the English-language versions of the games, she speaks with a Southern accent. Most of her moves are drawn from real-life pro wrestling. In the first game, Tina is initially a brunette and wears simple blue wrestling gear, which is greatly minimized in the first two sequels to a black bra and matching leather panties accentuated only by cowboy boots or a short vest, while her hair color was permanently changed to blonde. Her updated render for Dead or Alive 4 further enhances her cowgirl image with Western-style accessories such as a cowboy hat and fringed designer armbands, while her bra is changed from black to an American flag print. With the increased quality of the character renders in Dead or Alive 5, Tina was given a more realistic appearance with smaller eyes and even more revealing outfits; Dead or Alive 5 Last Round pre-order bonuses from Amazon.com included a skimpy "Showstopper" costume for the character. Tina in Last Round can additionally gain the costumes of Mail from Nihon Falcom's Popful Mail, Lilysse from Gust's Nights of Azure, Katsuragi from Tamsoft's Senran Kagura, and Cana Alberona from the manga and anime Fairy Tail, among others, including a ninja outfit, a costume designed by Tamiki Wakaki, and the Military Police Regiment uniform from Attack on Titan, as downloadable content.

Saturn Power described Tina as a "nightmare opponent" due to her throw-oriented style. Dreamcast Magazine cautioned not to "let her looks deceive you as she's one of the best fighters in the game." Anthony Chau of IGN wrote in 2001 that her offense in Dead or Alive 3 "can pack quite a wallop. Of all the grapplers in the game, she has the most balanced attacks; she can dish out good punch and kick combinations or piledrive opponents with powerful authority." He added that with her variety of throws, "she's one of the most exciting fighters to play." The staff of Official Xbox Magazine chose Tina as their top playable in Dead or Alive Ultimate, preferring "her violent wrestling moves" over the other characters' speed. GameSpot wrote in their Dead or Alive 4 strategy guide, "Tina's moveset is definitely that of a wrestler: lots of powerful mid and high punches, complemented by a dizzying array of throws", while players have to "be an expert at baiting" their opponent into attempting to counter their moves. However, GameSpy said, "Tina has a lot of disadvantages, mostly lying in her lack of speed in close combat", and thus required "trickery and a great sense of reading [one's] opponent ... to succeed consistently." She is able to perform additional special moves while fighting on a wrestling arena. According to Dean James from Attack of the Fanboy, "Tina's rather simplistic moveset allows players to get a hang of the different mechanics pretty easily and works as a good intro to the series in Dead or Alive 5 Last Round."

Other appearances

Film

Tina was played by Jaime Pressly in the 2006 live-action film DOA: Dead or Alive. Her backstory from the games is unchanged in that she wants to escape her wrestling background against Bass' wishes, causing him to enter the tournament in which he loses to his daughter, the difference being that Tina is competing to prove her worth as a real fighter rather than seeking fame. She and the three other main female characters—Kasumi, Christie, and Helena—team up to defeat the shady tournament organizer Victor Donovan near the conclusion.

The film's U.S. release was repeatedly delayed and had only a three-week run in theaters, for which Pressly expressed no regrets in a 2007 interview with Rotten Tomatoes. She revealed that she had joined the production because of director Corey Yuen ("one of the number one action and martial arts directors in the world"), but the experience was hampered by language barriers between the cast and crew, and the script deviating from the game series' storyline. "A lot of bad stuff came up and happened, [and] it just didn't turn out the way that it should have." The finished film was not screened for critics, and Pressly was only able to view it through an acquaintance of her My Name is Earl costar Jason Lee.

Merchandise
Tina has appeared on various official series merchandise, including action figures from Bandai and Epoch; figurines produced by Kotobukiya with varying costumes; a garage kit produced by Studio Saru Bunshitsu, and a clear file folder manufactured by Famitsu that displayed Tina posing in a bikini. Series developer Koei Tecmo released a host of licensed items, such as a 20" × 28" suede tapestry, an oppai (breasts-imitating) mousepad, phone cards, and a three-dimensional poster featuring the Dead or Alive 5 Plus cast. The company offered a downloadable "black bunny" swimsuit costume with pre-orders of Dead or Alive 5. Tina was among the DOA5 characters whose digital cards were added to Sega's PlayStation Vita release Samurai & Dragons in 2013.

Reception
Like the series' other female characters, Tina is most often noted in gaming media for her sex appeal. She was ranked the number-one "girl on the Dreamcast" by Dreamcast Magazine in 2000, who described her as "undeniably the most gorgeous." The same year, Spanish magazine Revista Oficial Dreamcast held a poll in which readers selected their favorite Dreamcast heroine; Tina received the most votes, topping the likes of Claire Redfield, Lara Croft, and Chun-Li. In G4's 2005 Video Game Vixens awards, she won in the "Dirtiest Dancer" and "Video Game Vixen of the Year" categories. Brazilian magazine SuperGamePower listed her among the 20 "muses" of video games in 2001. Rob Wright of Tom's Games included her in his 2007 selection of the fifty "greatest female characters" in video games. PLAY ranked Tina as the third-hottest blonde in games in 2010, and jokingly deemed her breasts "the undisputed #1 and #2 of all Dead or Alives features." UGO Networks included her among the "hottest girls in games" in 2011. "This female wrestler hits harder than any of the other DoA characters while still managing to show off the maximum amount of skin." The site additionally rated Tina eleventh in their ranking of the twenty-five "foxiest fighting females to be ever pixelated" that same year. Rich Shivener of Joystick Division chose both Tina and Kasumi's chests as the seventh-"most incredible" in video games. She has appeared in various top ten lists of the sexiest female video game characters, such as by TechTudo and TGbus. Crunchyroll's Nate Ming opined "Kasumi, Ayane, Lei-Fang and Kokoro are all pretty cool in their own ways, but none really stack up to hard-hitting hardbody Tina Armstrong." Despite all this, however, she failed to make the top 9 in the wallpaper contest to determine who will get into Dead or Alive Xtreme 3. Although Tina was confirmed to return in the third game's free to play PC gacha adaption, Dead or Alive Xtreme Venus Vacation in 2022, with the development started in the late-November 2021 and finalized her release date on January 28, 2022, to commerce Dead or Alive series’ anniversary, despite being ranked 2nd place between the newcomers NiCO (1st rank) and Mila (3rd rank) in the free to play game's 4th anniversary final poll result for which three remaining mainline Dead or Alive are the first to be qualify there, according to Weekly Famitsu Magazine on November 18, 2021. A poll for the most erotic girl in the history of fighting games conducted by Japanese web portal Goo had Leifang and Tina share the 17th/18th place (out of 50 contesters) in 2016.

Official Xbox Magazine opined that the series' females "have always been slightly controversial, with high-minded types lamenting the gratuitous use of bouncing bosoms", but the gameplay of Dead or Alive 3 "must have made all gamers, feminists included, realise that Tina, Kasumi et al are actually rather fit." However, Matthew O'Mara of National Post singled out Tina as embodying the "casual sexism" of the series: "Why does Tina's animation make her breasts flop about while most of the other characters remain stationary? Why does she have more outfits than any other character? Why do video game developers keep doing this?" Zachary Miller of Nintendo World Report nonetheless praised Tina's alternate idle animation as the "most impressive realism in terms of movement" in the history of video game breast physics. Tina's "strong arms and legs" in DOA2 impressed actress and model Leila Arcieri, while fellow actress-model Jaime Bergman claimed the character reminded her of herself. Criticizing Dead or Alive 6 for the game's characters, Eurogamer's Wesley Yin-Poole compared Tina Armstrong to Ivanka Trump.

Other publications have noted Tina for her characterization as well as her beauty. GamesRadar's Henry Gilbert rated her the fourth-best video-game wrestler in 2014. "Tina can pull off just about every devastating grapple ever invented—all while wearing a string bikini, no less—but she dreams of using her talents for something more." IGN said in 2004, "She's got a bit of tomboy and American sass ... she's got power to go along with beauty and puts the real ladies of the WWE to shame." Tina was ranked third on GameDaily's 2008 list of the top wrestling characters in video games. Sega Saturn Magazine described her as a "hot all-American babe with buns of steel". Complex chose Tina ("hot even amongst pixelated swimsuit models") as their favorite video-game grappler over Street Fighter's Rainbow Mika in their 2011 "Battle of the Beauties" feature, and rated her victory quote from Dead or Alive 4 ("Weak! You're going to have to do better than that") among their hundred "most humiliating" video-game victory quotes in 2012.

Electronic Gaming Monthly praised the "hot chicks [and] spirited casting" in a preview of DOA: Dead or Alive, noting "My Name is Earls white-trash hottie Jaime Pressly as Tina!" even as they expected the film as a whole to be "crap". Tina was ranked as the third-hottest woman in video game movies by Complex in 2012. Bill Gibron of PopMatters described the "capable" Pressly in the film as "full of piss and vinegar as a desperate-to-prove-herself grappler." Cinema Blend's Rafe Telsch wrote, "Like it or not, Pressly is the poster child of the movie, above her other attractive co-stars."

References

External links
  (DOA5)

Dead or Alive (franchise) characters
Female characters in video games
Fictional actors
Fictional American people in video games
Fictional models
Fictional characters from Texas
Fictional professional wrestlers
Fictional volleyball players
Koei Tecmo protagonists
Musician characters in video games
Politician characters in video games
Singer characters in video games
Video game characters introduced in 1996
Woman soldier and warrior characters in video games